Knight of the Sword,, is a 1969 Hong Kong action martial arts film directed by Lung Chien,  and starring Yeh Tien, Hsiao Yen Chang, Yu-Hua Ho.

Cast

 Yeh Tien		
 Chang Hsiao-yen
 Yu-Hua Ho
 Chun Huang
 Wei Ou
 Yueh Sun
 Lin Tung

References

External links

1969 films
1960s action films
1960s martial arts films
1960s Cantonese-language films
Films shot in Hong Kong
Hong Kong action films
Hong Kong films about revenge
Hong Kong martial arts films
Kung fu films
1960s Mandarin-language films
Films directed by Lung Chien
1970s Hong Kong films